Ruben Claassen (born 12 August 1993) is a South African first-class cricketer. He was included in the Northerns squad for the 2016 Africa T20 Cup.

References

External links
 

1993 births
Living people
South African cricketers
Northerns cricketers
Place of birth missing (living people)